Tarron Jackson (born June 22, 1998) is an American football defensive end for the Philadelphia Eagles of the National Football League (NFL). He played college football at Coastal Carolina.

Early life and high school
Jackson grew up in New Ellenton, South Carolina and attended Silver Bluff High School. He was named All-Area by the Aiken Standard as a senior after recording 79 tackles, 11 tackles for loss and five sacks.

College career
Jackson suffered a season-ending injury four games into his freshman year and used a medical redshirt. He played in the first eight games of his redshirt freshman season before again suffering a season-ending injury and finished the year with 3.5 sacks and a forced fumble. As a redshirt sophomore Jackson started all 12 of the Chanticleers' games and recorded 58 tackles with 11 tackles for loss and three sacks and was named third team All-Sun Belt Conference. He was named first team All-Sun Belt as a redshirt junior after setting a school record with ten sacks along with 60 total tackles, 13 tackles for loss and two forced fumbles. Jackson recorded 54 tackles, 14 tackles for loss, 8.5 sacks and three forced fumbles in his redshirt senior season and was named the Sun Belt Conference Defensive Player of the Year, first team All-Conference, and a first team All-American by the Associated Press.

Professional career
Jackson was selected in the sixth round with the 191st overall pick of the 2021 NFL Draft by the Philadelphia Eagles.

Jackson got his first career sack in Week 8 at the Detroit Lions.

On October 27, 2022, Jackson was waived by the Eagles and re-signed to the practice squad.

References

External links
Coastal Carolina Chanticleers bio

Living people
Players of American football from South Carolina
Sportspeople from Aiken, South Carolina
American football defensive ends
Philadelphia Eagles players
Coastal Carolina Chanticleers football players
All-American college football players
African-American players of American football
1998 births
21st-century African-American sportspeople